The First-tier Tribunal for Scotland forms part of the courts and tribunals that operate in Scotland. The First-Tier Tribunal for Scotland was created by the Tribunals (Scotland) Act 2014 which aimed to create a simplified structure for tribunals in Scotland. The functions of former tribunals have been transferred into the First-Tier Tribunal for Scotland and the structure enables for new jurisdictions to be created in the future.

The Lord President of the Court of Session, as head of the judiciary in Scotland, is responsible for the First-Tier Tribunal for Scotland. Some of the Lord President's functions in relation to tribunals have been delegated to the President of Scottish Tribunals, currently Lord Woolman.

The Scottish Courts and Tribunals Service is responsible for administering the First-Tier Tribunal for Scotland

Chambers and Jurisdiction
The First-Tier Tribunal for Scotland currently consists of five chambers.

General Regulatory Chamber
The General Regulatory Chamber inherited the jurisdiction of the Scottish Charity Appeals Panel to hear appeals against decisions of the Office of the Scottish Charity Regulator. It also inherited the functions of the Parking and Bus Lane Appeal Tribunal for Scotland to hear appeals against the issuing of Penalty Charge Notices by many Scottish local authorities for parking contraventions and also in relation to bus lane enforcement notifications from Aberdeen City Council, Edinburgh City Council and Glasgow City Council.

Health and Education Chamber
The Health and Education Chamber inherited the functions of the Additional Support Needs Tribunals for Scotland. The chamber will eventually have four jurisdictions within it, with the functions of Education Appeals Committees,  the NHS National Appeal Panel for Entry to the Pharmaceutical Lists and the NHS Tribunal for Scotland planned for transfer into the Chamber.

Housing and Property Chamber
The Housing and Property Chamber inherited the functions of the former Private Rented Housing Panel and the Homeowner Housing Panel. It has also inherreted jurisdiction from the Sheriff Court in relation to private rented housing, such making orders for the payment of rent arrears or applications to evict tenants where there is a ground for eviction.

Social Security Chamber
The Social Security Chamber hears appeals in relation to social security benefits which are awarded by Social Security Scotland. Appeals, in relation to benefits awarded by the Department for Work and Pensions are heard by the First-Tier Tribunal, which is part of Her Majesty's Courts and Tribunals Service.

Tax Chamber
The Tax Chamber hears appeals in relation to the devolved Scottish taxes administered by Revenue Scotland, currently Land and Buildings Transaction Tax and Scottish Landfill Tax.

Appeal
Decisions of the various chambers of the First-Tier Tribunal for Scotland may be made to the Upper Tribunal for Scotland. An appeal may only be made to the Upper Tribunal with the permission of the First-Tier Tribunal, failing which the Upper Tribunal.

References

Courts of Scotland
Scottish Courts and Tribunals Service
Legal organisations based in Scotland
Tribunals of the Scottish Government